MQA or mqa may refer to:

Organisations
 Malaysian Qualifications Agency, a statutory body in Malaysia
 Mauritius Qualifications Authority, a government organisation

Other uses
 Maba language (Indonesia) (ISO 639-3 code)
 Mandora Station Airport (IATA code)
 Missouri Quality Award, of Excellence in Missouri Foundation
 Marchio di Qualità Ambientale (Environmental Quality Brand), a project in the Parco Nazionale delle Cinque Terre, Italy
 Master Quality Authenticated, an audio codec